Tasker is a surname and occasionally a given name. Notable people with the name include:

Surname
 Alfred Tasker (born 1934), English cricketer
 Benjamin Tasker, Sr. (1690–1768), Provincial Governor of Maryland
 Benjamin Tasker, Jr. (1720–1760), Maryland politician, delegate to the Albany Congress, racehorse owner
 Caleb Tasker (born 1996), Australian Music Producer
 Bruce Tasker (born 1987), British bobsleigher and track athlete
 Elizabeth Tasker, Australian fire ecologist
 Elizabeth J. Tasker (born 1980), British astrophysicist
 Glenn Tasker, Australian sports administrator
 Homer G. Tasker (1899–1990), American sound engineer
 Jill Tasker (born 1964), American actress
 Joe Tasker (1948–1982), British climber
 John Tasker (disambiguation), multiple people, including:
 J. Wilder Tasker (1887–1974), American collegiate football, basketball, and baseball coach
 Leo Tasker (1900–1948), Australian rules footballer
 Luke Tasker (born 1991), American wide receiver
 Marianne Allen Tasker (1852–1911), New Zealand domestic servant
 Nathan Tasker, Australian Christian pop artist
 Paul Tasker, English engineer
 Peter Tasker, Australian Anglican bishop
 Ralph Tasker, (1919–1999), American high-school basketball coach
 Robert Tasker, (1868–1959) British architect and politician
 Rolly Tasker (1926–2012), Australian sailor
 Roly Tasker (1907–1972), Australian rules footballer 
 Sean Tasker (born 1968), Australian rules footballer
 Steve Tasker (born 1962), American football player and sports broadcaster
 William Tasker (1891–1918), Australian rugby player and World War I soldier
 William Tasker (poet) (1740–1800), English clergyman, scholar and poet

Fictional characters
 Harry Tasker, protagonist of the action-comedy film True Lies
 Marissa Tasker, fictional character in the soap opera All My Children

Given name
 Tasker H. Bliss (1853–1930), United States Army general, Army Chief of Staff, and diplomat
 Tasker Cook (1867–1937), politician in the Dominion of Newfoundland
 Tasker Oddie (1870–1950), American politician
 Tasker Watkins (1918–2007), Welsh Lord Justice of Appeal and deputy Lord Chief Justice

See also
 Kemp & Tasker, British architectural firm of the 1930s
Tasker, automation app for Android
 Taskers of Andover, manufacturer of steam traction engines
 Task (disambiguation)